Finnberg is a surname. Notable people with the surname include:

Axel Finnberg (born 1971), German tennis player
Gustaf Wilhelm Finnberg (1784–1833), Finnish painter

See also
Fineberg